The Johnnie Walker World Golf Championship was a golf event held at the Tryall Golf Club in Jamaica from 1991 to 1995.

The tournament was intended to be an official World Championship event to rival the four majors but was terminated after just five stagings.

Winners

References

External links
Tryall Golf Club

Golf tournaments in Jamaica
International sports competitions hosted by Jamaica